Dihdadi District (Pop: 65,600) is situated in the central part of Balkh province, Afghanistan. It is not far from the capital of the province Mazari Sharif - about 15 km in eastern direction from the district capital Dihdadi (also Dehdadi).

References

Districts of Balkh Province